Dmitry Tamelo (born 8 November 1992) is a Belarusian professional footballer who plays for Naftan Novopolotsk.

References

External links 
 
 

1992 births
Living people
Belarusian footballers
Association football midfielders
FC Energetik-BGU Minsk players
FC Torpedo Minsk players
FC Naftan Novopolotsk players
FC Smorgon players